Shaun Lanard Gayle (born March 8, 1962) is a former American football defensive back in the NFL. He played twelve seasons, eleven for the Chicago Bears (1984–1994), and one for the San Diego Chargers (1995). He was a member of the Bears squad that won Super Bowl XX in 1985. He was also a member of the "Shuffling Crew" in the video The Super Bowl Shuffle. Gayle attended Ohio State University.

Gayle owns the distinction of returning the shortest punt for a touchdown in NFL history, when he returned a punt five yards for a touchdown against the New York Giants in the Bears 1985 divisional playoff victory. Shaun often appears with former teammates at Chicago Bears Fan Conventions, and currently works as an NFL analyst for Sky Sports, appearing on the weekly NFL broadcast. He is also known for getting bullied by 49er QB Steve Young in the end zone during a playoff game after Young scored a touchdown right in front of him.

Personal life

Murder of Rhoni Reuter
Gayle had a relationship with Rhoni Reuter, originally of Potosi, Wisconsin. On October 4, 2007, Reuter was about seven months pregnant with Gayle's child when she was shot and killed at her condominium in Deerfield, Illinois. On March 3, 2009, a Chicago woman, Marni Yang, 41, was arrested and charged with two counts of first-degree murder. Yang was also in a relationship with Gayle.  It was alleged that Yang was wearing a disguise when she shot and killed Reuter in a jealous rage. In March 2011, Yang was convicted of first-degree murder for the killing.

The Deerfield police have stated that they did not consider Gayle to be a suspect in the murder. Yang's attorney has asserted that Gayle provided false information to the police, and that his whereabouts were unknown for the time of the murder. , the case was under judicial review.

References

1962 births
Living people
Sportspeople from Newport News, Virginia
Players of American football from Virginia
American football cornerbacks
American football safeties
Ohio State Buckeyes football players
Chicago Bears players
National Conference Pro Bowl players
San Diego Chargers players
Ed Block Courage Award recipients
Brian Piccolo Award winners